Oriol Paulí Fornells (born May 20, 1994) is a Spanish professional basketball player for FC Barcelona of the Liga ACB. The small forward was known as one of the top international prospects for the 2015 NBA draft, but went undrafted.

Professional career
Paulí has experience playing for FC Barcelona B and has been named to multiple Spanish junior squads, including the under-20 team.

On 2014, Paulí signed a four-year contract with Herbalife Gran Canaria. He debuted in Liga ACB, the top Spanish league, and played the 2015 Eurocup Finals.

On July 13, 2020, he has signed a three year deal with Andorra of the Liga ACB.

References

External links
Profile at ACB.com
Profile at Eurocup Basketball

1994 births
Living people
Basketball players from Catalonia
BC Andorra players
Spanish expatriate basketball people in Andorra
CB Gran Canaria players
FC Barcelona Bàsquet B players
Liga ACB players
Sportspeople from Girona
Spanish men's basketball players
Small forwards